Game Changer II is the eighth studio album by American singer Johnny Gill. It was released by J Skillz Entertainment in conjunction with Kavalry Records. A sequel to his 2014 album Game Changer, it peaked at number 15 on the US Independent Albums chart.

Critical reception

Allmusic editor Andy Kellman found that "in terms of quality and style" the album was "more of a mixed bag than the preceding LP [...] The songs skip across eras, moving from old-school pleaders to liquid late-'80s grooves to trap-styled beats, incorporating a lovely Luther Vandross homage ("That's My Baby") and a Jam and Lewis reunion ("So Hard") super-charged with inspiration from Bill Conti's Rock soundtrack. Gill handles all the turns with his deep baritone, growling and lilting only when necessary."

Track listing

Charts

References

2019 albums
Johnny Gill albums